Luka Radonić (2 February 1993) is a Croatian rower. He won a gold medal at the 2018 Mediterranean Games competing in lightweight single sculls.

He was born in Zagreb in February 1993. He took up rowing at the age of 12, before which he played ice hockey.

Radonić won bronze medal at the U23 World Championships in 2015. He placed 5th in the 2018 European Rowing Championships.

References 

Croatian male rowers
Mediterranean Games gold medalists for Croatia
Sportspeople from Zagreb
Mediterranean Games medalists in rowing
1993 births
Living people
Competitors at the 2018 Mediterranean Games
21st-century Croatian people